Crampton Lake is a lake that is primarily located in Vilas County, Wisconsin. A small portion is in Gogebic County, Michigan. It is found near the town of Land o' Lakes, Wisconsin, and is on land managed by the University of Notre Dame Environmental Research Center.

Characteristics
Crampton Lake is a 0.25 km2 (61 acres) seepage lake. The lake is typically frozen over from November to March.

Ecology
The area surrounding Crampton Lake is woody wetlands. The most common fish found in the lake include bluegill, largemouth bass, and yellow perch, with smaller populations of central mudminnow, Johnny darter, golden shiner, and pumpkinseed also present.

References

Lakes of Wisconsin